Tommy Norden (born September 25, 1952, New York City) is a former American actor. Norden is widely known for his years playing Bud Ricks, the red-haired, younger brother of Sandy Ricks (Luke Halpin) on the television series Flipper.

Other performances include a minor role in the film Five Miles to Midnight (1962), with Anthony Perkins and Sophia Loren, as well as TV roles on the series Naked City (1961–62), including one episode with Luke Halpin, Episode 93 of Route 66 (1963), Episode 19 of  East Side/West Side (1964) with George C. Scott and Barbara Feldon, Search for Tomorrow (1971–1973), where he played Dr. Gary Walton, and Episode 8 of The Secrets of Isis (1975). He also appeared on Sing Along With Mitch (1963) as one of the Sing Along Kids.  Prior to his film and television roles, he appeared on Broadway with Anthony Perkins in the musical comedy Greenwillow (March 8, 1960 - May 28, 1960), as well as in The Music Man (1960–61).  Norden left acting in order to pursue the family business.

He appeared in a 1962 Oreo commercial, "Oreos – Little Girls Have Pretty Curls", which won the Best Baked Goods & Confections Award at the 1962 American TV Commercial Awards and was exhibited at the 12th MoMA International Festival of Film Preservation in 2014.  He also appeared in a 1962 promotional film for New York Airways, entitled "The Skyline Route".

Norden attended Power Memorial Academy in New York City (Class of 1971), presently owns an executive recruiting company in New York City, and appeared at the Miami Seaquarium's 40th and 50th anniversary celebrations of Flipper.

References

External links

1952 births
American male film actors
American male television actors
American male child actors
Businesspeople from New York City
Male actors from New York City
Living people